Kevin Lynch Hurling Club  is a Gaelic Athletic Association club based in Dungiven, County Londonderry, Northern Ireland. They currently cater for hurling. The Gaelic football and ladies' Gaelic football club in the town is St. Canice's GAC.

History
Dungiven has two Gaelic Athletic Association clubs. The Gaelic football club called Dungiven GAC was founded in 1943 and originally included a hurling section . In 1981 the hurling section of Dungiven GAC  was renamed in honour of Kevin Lynch from Dungiven who died on the 1981 Irish hunger strike, whilst the football team retained the existing name. Kevin Lynch's club retained the hurling honours won as Dungiven as part of its history.

Hurling titles
* = Includes championships won as part of Dungiven GAC

 Derry Senior Hurling Championship
 1967, 1972, 1973, 1974, 1975, 1976, 1977, 1979, 1980, 1981, 1982, 1984, 1987, 1986, 1996, 1998, 2003, 2004, 2006, 2007, 2008, 2009, 2011
 Derry Junior Hurling Championship
 2001

Note: The above lists may be incomplete. Please add any other honours you know of.

Derry Hurling Championship winning line-ups:

Well-known hurlers

 Kieran McKeever - former Derry dual player
 Brian McGilligan - former Derry dual player
 Geoffrey McGonagle - former Derry dual player

See also
Derry Senior Hurling Championship
List of Gaelic games clubs in Derry

References

External links
Kevin Lynchs Hurling Clubs official website

Gaelic games clubs in County Londonderry
Hurling clubs in County Londonderry